Ricky Hui Kwun-ying (3 August 1946 – 8 November 2011) was a Hong Kong actor and singer. He along with his brothers, Michael and Sam, made several comedy blockbusters in the 1970s and 1980s.

Biography
Ricky Hui Kun-ying was born 3 August 1946 in Panyu, Guangdong, China. He had four siblings, Samuel, Michael, Stanley and Judy. The Hui family migrated from mainland China to Hong Kong in 1950 and settled in the then poor area of Diamond Hill. His father worked hard and undertook any work available to be able to support his family. In the Hui family Arts played a very significant role. Ricky's father played the violin and his mother loved Cantonese opera.

Films
Ricky worked as a correspondent for the French Press Agency in Hong Kong. He also frequently appeared in Shaw Brothers films between 1972 and 1976, such as The Lizard (1972), The 14 Amazons (1972), The Sugar Daddies (1973), The Generation Gap (1973), Rivals of Kung Fu (1974), Hong Kong 73 (1974) etc. For him the big break came when he joined his brothers on screen.

Hui's first major role was in Games Gamblers Play (1974) as a card player followed by The Last Message (1975) with a short appearance as a waiter. Ricky had a larger role in The Private Eyes (1976) and with that film a new era of the Hong Kong Cinema started. The Hui brothers' comedy films were an influential part of Hong Kong cinema. Their films were packed with visual gags and unique Cantonese humor. Although Ricky had only a small role in The Private Eyes, it remained one of the all time favorites among fans. According to Michael Hui, Ricky had only brief appearance in this film because at that time he had a contract with the Shaw Brothers. Reportedly, his contract with the Shaw Brothers ended around 1976, because the last Shaw Brothers film he appeared in was Challenge of the Masters that year. The following year found Ricky at Golden Harvest with a leading role in John Woo's Money Crazy as well as From Riches to Rags. In 1979 Games Gamblers Play was released in the Japanese market. For this edition Michael shot a new scene, a fight between Ricky and Sam on the beach, and replaced the original Sammo Hung vs Sam Hui fight with it. The next Hui brothers production where Ricky teamed up with his brothers again was The Contract in 1978, followed by Security Unlimited (1981), one of the most successful films featuring the Hui brothers; Security Unlimited was full of gags and included the Huis' trademark Cantonese humor. In the late 1970s and early 1980s Ricky played leading roles in John Woo films like From Riches To Rags (1979), To Hell with the Devil (1982) or Plain Jane To The Rescue (1982).

Michael became a producer in 1987 and Ricky appeared in his films: Chicken and Duck Talk (1988), Front Page (1990), The Magic Touch (1992). In 1985 Sammo Hung produced one of the biggest cult films Mr. Vampire where Ricky Hui played Man Choi, a memorable role on the side of the unforgettable (Lam Ching-ying).

Ricky was most active in his film career in the 1970s and 1980s. In the late 1990s he appeared in only one film, in First Love Unlimited (1997). He later rejoined his brother Sam in Winner Takes All (2000). The last films Ricky Hui appeared in were Super Model and Forever Yours, both from 2004.

Music
Hui has also released seven albums, most of them on vinyl in the 1970s and 1980s. There are three Ricky albums on vinyl: 發錢寒 (1977), 夏之戀 (1978), 錢作怪 (1980). In 1993 '93 急流? was released, which featured new songs by Sam Hui and guest vocals from Michael Hui. The second album in 1993 was 一生渴望 (Lifelong Desire) a 2-CD set that featured one CD of hits from the 1970s and 1980s, and brand-new Mandarin recordings of songs from '93 急流?. It also paved the way for Ricky's 2 shows at the Hong Kong Coliseum (produced by Sam Hui). The third CD was released in 2001, called The Classical Songs of Universal. It is the re-released version of the album from 1980 with a few extra songs. The last, Greatest Hits album (2CDs), 十足斤兩, was released ony 26 July 2006.

Ricky also wrote some songs for his brother Sam: On Sam Hui's debut Cantonese album, Ricky wrote 3 complete songs (music and lyrics): Track 3 (甜蜜伴侶), track 4 (無情夜冷風), and track 11 (夜雨聲). On Sam's 2nd Cantonese album, Ricky contributed 2 songs: track 5 (情人離別去), track 10 (歡樂桃源), and track 11 (故苑懷舊). On Sam's 3rd Cantonese album, Ricky has one contribution: track 12 (流水恨). He also wrote a song that can only be heard on his own debut album in 1977: 月影.

In 2000 Ricky had a stage play called Ha Luk Hei Ban (蝦碌戲班). In the same year he appeared in five episodes of the ATV series Heung Gong Yat Ka Chun. In 2001 a DVD was released of a variety show about the development of Hong Kong entertainment, called Laughing Kaleidoscope which featured Ricky among various artists on stage. In the same year he participated with three songs in the La Fai Palace Jubilee concert. In 2003 Ricky appeared in a concert commemorating the 8th anniversary of the death of Teresa Teng and also celebrating her 50th birthday. Ricky participated with three songs in Sing Along Golden Hits Encore Concert in 2004 among other stars. He appeared in the Rosanne in Starry Night Concert in March, 2006.

Ricky was also a returning guest on Sam Hui's concerts singing a few songs on his own or duets with his brother. He often participated in television game shows as well.

On 30 July 2006, Ricky appeared on concert in Jockey Club Auditorium, at The Hong Kong Polytechnic University.

Death
Ricky Hui died of a heart attack at home on 8 November 2011 at the age of 65. His funeral was held at Po Fook Hill Memorial Hall in Sha Tin, and was attended by dozens of guests and relatives. His family followed his wishes to put his ashes to sea in Sai Kung. 8th November also is the death day of Lam Ching-ying, who was Ricky Hui's partner in "Mr Vampire".

Filmography

References

External links

Ricky Hui an Appreciation Site from Hungary
 Ricky Hui on Hong Kong Cinemagic
 Ricky Hui Forum
 Special topic on the English board of Hong Kong Cinemagic
 

1946 births
Hong Kong male film actors
Hong Kong male comedians
2011 deaths
People from Panyu District
Male actors from Guangzhou
20th-century Hong Kong male actors
21st-century Hong Kong male actors
Hong Kong male singers
Cantopop singers